The Preceptor N3 Pup is a family of ultralight, tube-and-fabric, high-wing, homebuilt aircraft. Kits were produced and marketed by Preceptor Aircraft, of Rutherfordton, North Carolina. The company was operating on a limited basis, actively selling plans online, but seems to have gone out of business in 2016.

It may also be built as an amateur-built aircraft or US light-sport aircraft at higher weights.

Design and development

The Pup is designed to be flown cross-country and also can be mounted with floats and skis.

The N3 Pup uses tube-and-fabric construction and a conventional 4-cycle engine. The fuselage and tail are welded from 4130 steel tube. There are two main wing configurations that can be built. An aluminum wing spar with hinges allows the wings to be folded for trailering or storage. A wooden wing spar configuration gives the plane a lighter weight, but leaves the wings fixed. The engine cowling is made from fiberglass.

The aircraft has had many engine choices available, but was marketed to use the Half VW engine first developed by Global engines, later bought by Mosler engines and finally marketed by TEC engines. The Total Engine Concepts MM CB-40 was the last purpose-built engine marketed for the Pup. The aircraft was sold as a partially prefabricated kit or can be built scratchbuilt from plans.

The design was also adapted as an autogyro, the Little Wing Roto-Pup.

Operational history
A N3 Pup named "Citabriette" -- modified to look like a Citabria -- won the Grand Champion Ultralight award at the EAA Oshkosh airshow 1988.

Variants

N3 Pup
Single seat variant designed to resemble a 3/4 scale Piper J-3 Cub. Originally named the Nostalgair N-3 Pup.
Stinger
Single seat variant with a parasol wing in place of the enclosed cabin, longer nose and larger engine. First flown in 1995. Two had been completed by December 2011.
Super Pup
Single seat variant with larger engine and higher empty weight, first flown in 1995.
Ultra Pup (N3-2)	
Two seat 3/4 scale Piper J-3 Cub, first flown in 1988 with a  MM-CB engine. Folding wings for storage or ground transport. 200 had been completed and flown by December 2011.

Specifications (N3 Pup)

References

External links

Homebuilt aircraft
Light-sport aircraft
N3
1990s United States sport aircraft
1990s United States ultralight aircraft
Single-engined tractor aircraft